Christ Church Ground is a cricket ground in Oxford, England. The ground is owned by Christ Church, a constituent college of the University of Oxford. Owing to the University Parks being on public land where an admission charge could not be levied, the privately owned Christ Church Ground was the preferred venue in Oxford for matches where a gated admission was to be levied on spectators, typically in matches between Oxford University and a touring international team. The ground operated as a first-class cricket venue from 1878 to 1961, hosting 37 first-class matches. After 1961, the University Parks became the preferred venue for all first-class matches in Oxford, but it remained in use in minor counties cricket by Oxfordshire until the start of the 21st century. Today the ground is used by the Christ Church Cricket Club.

History

Early history
John Peel, who studied at Oxford and was captain of the Christ Church Cricket Club, was instrumental in the establishment of the first cricket ground which Christ Church possessed. It was located not far from the Old White House public house and was on the right-hand side of the nearby Cherwell Valley line when heading toward London. By the 1850s, Christ Church had acquired land along the Iffley Road, where they established the present day Christ Church Ground. The newly acquired ground was used by early Oxfordshire sides in the 1850s, in matches against an All-England Eleven, with the Oxfordshire side typically containing 16 players. Matches in the 1850s were well attended by large crowds. The ground was described as a "splendid" venue by The Sportsman in June 1867. First-class cricket was first played at the Christ Church Ground in June 1878, with Oxford University Cricket Club playing the Gentlemen of England in a match which lasted for two days, with the Gentlemen winning by an innings.

Host ground for touring sides
Oxford University began playing first-class matches at the University Parks in 1881, having previously used the Magdalen Ground. With the University Parks being open to the public, an admission charge could not be levied for major matches. Therefore, the second match of the 1881 season between Oxford University and the Gentlemen of England was moved to the Christ Church Ground, where being on private land, admission could be charged. During the match the pitch at the Christ Church Ground was deemed dangerous, with play being halted at 3pm on the first day after Oxford's Edward Peake had injured one of the Gentlemen cricketers with a blow to the head; the match was subsequently moved back to the University Parks and restarted. Subsequent matches with admission on the gate were preferred to be played at the Christ Church Ground, with Oxford University first playing the touring Australians there in 1882 on a cloudy May day, though it was recorded that the attendance was poor.

Two years later, Oxford recorded their first and only victory against the Australians at the Christ Church Ground, thanks in part to contributions from Tim O'Brien (92), Hugh Whitby (8 for 82), and E. W. Bastard (5 for 44). The Australians returned to the ground against Oxford as part of their 1886 tour, in what was a low-scoring match where neither side managed to pass more than 70 runs in an innings; the match was notable for Fred Spofforth's 15 wickets in the match, including 9 for 18 in the Oxford first innings. Surrey were the first county opposition to be hosted at the ground in 1892, when they played Oxford University; the Christ Church Ground was again the preferred venue in Oxford in order to secure a gated admission, with the match being well attended. Later in December 1892, an association football match was held at the ground between the county football association's of Oxfordshire and Huntingdonshire, played under rain which rendered the ground "in a very bad state".

Having played minor matches at the Christ Church Ground, such as against Wiltshire in 1891, Oxfordshire played their inaugural match in the Minor Counties Championship there against Worcestershire in 1895. The match was poorly attended, in contrast to the first-class fixtures played there to that point. In 1897, the ground played host to a touring side other than the Australians, when the Gentlemen of Philadelphia played against Oxford University. Between the turn of the century and the First World War, gated first-class matches at the ground continued unabated and included the first visit of the Indians to Oxford, as part of their inaugural tour of England in 1911. Although the First World War bought an end to first-class cricket between 1914 and 1919, the ground remained in use for inter-college matches and additionally saw various armed forces representative sides play there. First-class cricket returned to the ground in 1921, with a visit from the touring Australians, which was played in front of a large crowd who witnessed Douglas Jardine and R. L. Holdsworth save the match for Oxford. Between 1922 and the Second World War the regularity with which first-class cricket was played at the ground decreased, with just four first-class fixtures, all featuring the Australians, being played there during that time. The 1930 fixture between the teams was notable for Bill Ponsford's unbeaten 220 in front of a crowd of 5,000, while the 1938 fixture saw the Australians make the highest team total at the ground, with 679 for 7 declared.

With the suspension of first-class cricket in the Second World War, no first-class cricket would be played at the ground for a decade. During the war, the ground did play host to exhibition matches. These included Oxford University playing a British Empire XI in 1940, and the Australian Services in 1945. First-class cricket returned to the ground in 1948, with a visit from the Australians. The 1950s saw first visits to the ground by both the touring West Indians in 1950, and the touring South Africans in 1955, in addition to hosting the Australians on two occasions. The ground played host to its final first-class match in 1961, with a visit from the Australians. The Christ Church Ground played host to a total of 37 first-class matches, 26 of which featured touring sides; 21 one of those matches featured the touring Australians.

Later use

The touring Australians and Oxford University were due to play in a first-class match at the ground in 1964, however the match was moved to the University Parks because the Oxford cricket authorities considered that ground more suitable for hosting the match; despite the University Parks being public land, and thus unable to levy an admission charge, this was overcome by the erection of a screened section around the ground where gated admission could be charged. Subsequent visits to Oxford by touring international teams were hosted at the University Parks.

List A one-day cricket was first played at the Christ Church Ground in the 1981 NatWest Trophy, when Oxfordshire played Glamorgan. Their first-class opponents won the match by 8 wickets, with Malcolm Nash taking figures of 5 for 31. A combined Minor Counties cricket team used the ground as their home venue for both of their home Group D matches in the 1987 Benson & Hedges Cup. Oxfordshire played three one-day matches there in the 1989, 1990 and 1992 NatWest Trophy's, before a hiatus of nine years where Oxfordshire played their home one-day matches at Kingston Blount in rural Oxfordshire. Oxfordshire returned to play, to date, the last one-day match with List A status to be played at the ground in the 1st round of the 2002 Cheltenham & Gloucester Trophy against the Nottinghamshire Cricket Board, which was played late in the 2001 season; this final match saw the highest one-day score at the ground, an unbeaten 126 by Oxfordshire's Craig Haupt. Oxfordshire used the ground for minor counties fixtures throughout the 20th century, but ceased to use the ground at the beginning of the 21st century. In total Oxfordshire played 81 Minor Counties Championship and 16 MCCA Knockout Trophy matches at the ground.

The ground was a venue for a group stage match in the 1993 Women's Cricket World Cup between Denmark women and Ireland women, which the Irish won by 70 runs; to date, this remains the only Women's One Day International to be played at the ground.

Records

First-class
Highest team total: 679 for 7 declared by Australians v Oxford University, 1938
Lowest team total: 38 all out by Australians v Oxford University, 1886
Highest individual innings: 220 not out by Bill Ponsford for Australians v Oxford University, 1930
Best bowling in an innings: 9-18 by Fred Spofforth for Australians v Oxford University, 1886
Best bowling in a match: 15-36 by Fred Spofforth, as above

List A
Highest team total: 283 for 5 (60 overs) by Lancashire v Oxfordshire, 1992
Lowest team total: 88 all out (34.1 overs) by Oxfordshire v Lancashire, as above
Highest individual innings: 126 not out by Craig Haupt for Oxfordshire v Nottinghamshire Cricket Board, 2001
Best bowling in an innings: 5-31 by Malcolm Nash for Glamorgan v Oxfordshire, 1981

See also
List of Oxfordshire County Cricket Club grounds

References

External links
Christ Church Ground at ESPNcricinfo

Christ Church, Oxford
University of Oxford sites
Sport at the University of Oxford
Cricket grounds in Oxfordshire
Oxford University Cricket Club
Oxfordshire County Cricket Club
Defunct football venues in England
Parks and open spaces in Oxford
Sports venues in Oxford
University sports venues in the United Kingdom